Robert Falls (born March 2, 1954) is an American theater director and the current artistic director of the Goodman Theatre in Chicago, Illinois.

Biography

Early years
Falls was born in Ashland, Illinois to Arthur Joseph Falls and Nancy (Stribling) Falls. He received his BFA in Directing and Playwriting at the University of Illinois, Urbana-Champaign, after which he studied acting with Edward Kaye-Martin in New York. His career as a theater director was launched with his 1985 production of Hamlet at the Wisdom Bridge Theatre, where he served as artistic director from 1977 to 1985.

Since 1986, he has served as the artistic director of Chicago's Goodman Theatre, where he has directed more than 30 major productions and produced/co-produced more than 200 plays and 100 premieres. In September 2021 Falls announced that he would step down as Goodman's artistic director at the conclusion of the 2021/22 season.

Career
During Falls' two decades at the Goodman, the largest not-for-profit producing theater in Chicago, Illinois, the theater was named in 2003 by Time magazine one of the “top ten best theater companies in the United States” and received a Special Tony Award for Outstanding Regional Theatre (1992). Falls has directed more than 30 major productions and produced/co-produced more than 200 plays and 100 premieres on local, national and international stages. 

His Chicago credits include performances at Goodman Theatre, Lyric Opera of Chicago, Remains Theatre, Ivanhoe Theatre, Wisdom Bridge Theatre, St. Nicholas Theatre, Athaneum Theatre, Oak Park Festival Theater, Northlight Theatre and Court Theatre. New York credits include productions at Roundabout Theatre, Longacre Theatre, Playwrights Horizons, Manhattan Theatre Club/Biltmore, Plymouth Theatre, Joseph Papp Public Theater, Eugene O’Neill Theatre, Metropolitan Opera Company, Westside Theatre, Circle in the Square, Lincoln Center Theater, New York Shakespeare Festival, Belasco Theatre, Guthrie Theater, The Acting Company and Direct Theatre. International credits include productions at Lyric Theatre in London, Abbey Theatre in Dublin; and productions in Scotland, Germany, Japan, South Korea and the Netherlands, among other countries.

Broadway
Falls most recently directed American Buffalo, by David Mamet, on Broadway at the Belasco Theatre.  The production starred Haley Joel Osment, Cedric the Entertainer and John Leguizamo. It received mixed reviews, closing after just eight performances.

More successfully, Falls directed Talk Radio by Eric Bogosian at the Longacre Theatre, which was nominated for a 2007 Tony Award for Best Revival of a Play. The play starred Liev Schreiber, who was nominated for a 2007 Tony Award for Best Actor in a Play for his work. He directed the American premiere of Conor McPherson's Shining City on Broadway, starring Oliver Platt; both the production and Platt's performance were nominated for 2006 Tony Awards.

In 1996, Falls directed a re-mounting of his nationally acclaimed 1994 Goodman production of Tennessee Williams' The Night of the Iguana on Broadway. Falls directed Horton Foote's The Young Man From Atlanta, which was nominated for a 1997 Tony Award for Best Play. His 1998/1999 production of Death of a Salesman for the Goodman moved to Broadway, where it was honored with four 1999 Tony Awards, including Best Director of a Play and Best Revival of a Play. It was also named by Time magazine as one of the season's "10 best" American theater productions. His production of Elton John and Tim Rice's Aida, which ran on Broadway between 2000 and 2004, went on to tour Germany, Japan, South Korea and the Netherlands. His Broadway production of Eugene O’Neill's Long Day's Journey into Night, starring Brian Dennehy, Vanessa Redgrave, Philip Seymour Hoffman and Robert Sean Leonard, received three 2003 Tony Awards, including Best Revival of a Play, and three 2003 Drama Desk Awards, including Outstanding Director of a Play.

Premieres
Falls is known for his bold, grand-scale world-premiere productions, which have included Blind Date by Rogelio Martinez (2018), Frank's Home by Richard Nelson (2006), Dollhouse by Rebecca Gilman (2005), Blue Serge by Rebecca Gilman (2001), Finishing the Picture by Arthur Miller (2004), Griller by Eric Bogosian (1997), Riverview: A Melodrama with Music by John Logan (1992), On the Open Road by Steve Tesich (1989), Book of the Night by Louis Rosen and Thom Bishop (1991) and The Speed of Darkness by Steve Tesich (1989) at Goodman Theatre. At Westside Theatre in New York, Falls directed the world premiere of The Food Chain by Nicky Silver in 1995. 

At Lincoln Center Theater in New York, he directed the world premiere of SubUrbia by Eric Bogosian in 1994. At Wisdom Bridge Theatre, he directed the world premieres of Life and Limb by Keith Reddin (1984), In the Belly of the Beast: Letters from Prison by Jack Abbott (1983), Standing on My Knees by John Olive (1981) and Bagtime by Alan Rosen, Louis Rosen and Thom Bishop, based on the newspaper columns of Bob Greene and Paul Galloway (a co-production with Drury Lane Water Tower Theatre) in 1979. He also directed the world premiere of Fits and Starts by Grace McKeaney at Northlight Theatre in Evanston, Illinois in 1978.

References

https://www.chicagotribune.com/entertainment/theater/chris-jones/ct-ent-bob-falls-goodman-theatre-chicago-20210915-b2tu4phdqrbrbinl43k2ft4sui-story.html?outputType=amp

External links
 
 
 
 
 Goodman Theatre official website

1954 births
Living people
American theatre directors
Drama Desk Award winners
Tony Award winners
Artists from Chicago